Archery at the 2004 Summer Paralympics took place at the Olympic Baseball Centre in Athens. There were three categories:

W1 quadriplegic archers, or comparable disability, in wheelchairs
W2 paraplegic archers, or comparable disability, in wheelchairs
ST archers standing or shooting from a chair

Participating countries

Medal table

Medal summary

See also
Archery at the 2004 Summer Olympics

References

 
2004 Summer Paralympics events
2004